Ben Holden (born November 3, 1970 in Lansing, Michigan) is a sportscaster most recently with CBS Sports Network and has been with the Big Ten Network.

Biography
Holden called college football, basketball, and ice hockey for the CBS Sports Network and done similar roles for the Big Ten Network and Comcast SportsNet and was the voice of the Lake Erie Monsters. He has even called football and hockey games for ESPNU and CBS College Sports Network. For one season, Holden called games for the Indianapolis Indians. He also called the 2008 Stanley Cup Finals for NHL International as well and served as sports anchor/reporter for WILX-TV. He won two Emmy Awards; one in 2007 and one in 2008. He also has called college field hockey, softball, lacrosse, and soccer games for ESPN Plus. He also has called Arena football, MISL soccer, women's college basketball, volleyball, and wrestling.

References

http://radiodiscussions.com/smf/index.php?action=printpage;topic=198548.0
http://sportsmediajournal.com/2012/09/25/college-hockey-this-season-on-cbs-sports-network

Living people
1970 births
People from Lansing, Michigan
American sports announcers
Ice hockey commentators
National Hockey League broadcasters
Lacrosse announcers
Baseball announcers
College football announcers
College basketball announcers in the United States
Association football commentators
Arena football announcers
Women's college basketball announcers in the United States
American Hockey League broadcasters
College hockey announcers in the United States
Alliance of American Football announcers